ADP-ribosylation factor-binding protein GGA2 is a protein that in humans is encoded by the GGA2 gene.

Function 

This gene encodes a member of the Golgi-localized, gamma adaptin ear-containing, ARF-binding (GGA) family. This family includes ubiquitous coat proteins that regulate the trafficking of proteins between the trans-Golgi network and the lysosome. These proteins share an amino-terminal VHS domain which mediates sorting of the mannose 6-phosphate receptors at the trans-Golgi network. They also contain a carboxy-terminal region with homology to the ear domain of gamma-adaptins. This family member may play a significant role in cargo molecules regulation and clathrin-coated vesicle assembly.

Interactions 

GGA2 has been shown to interact with RABEP1, Sortilin 1, BACE2 and CLINT1.

References

Further reading